A Modern Monte Cristo is a 1917 American silent drama film directed by Eugene Moore and starring Vincent Serrano, Helen Badgley and Thomas A. Curran. It is also known by the alternative title of Eye for an Eye.

Cast
 Vincent Serrano as Doctor Emerson 
 Helen Badgley as Virginia Deane, age 6 
 Thomas A. Curran as William Deane 
 Gladys Dore as Virginia Deane, age 18 
 Boyd Marshall as Tom Pemberton 
 H.M. Rhinehardt as Aviator

References

Bibliography
 Robert B. Connelly. The Silents: Silent Feature Films, 1910-36, Volume 40, Issue 2. December Press, 1998.

External links
 

1917 films
1917 drama films
1910s English-language films
American silent feature films
Silent American drama films
American black-and-white films
Films directed by Eugene Moore
Pathé Exchange films
1910s American films